Amboy Township is one of the twelve townships of Fulton County, Ohio, United States. As of the 2020 census the population was 1,878, up from 1,846 at the 2010 census. 1,219 of the residents lived in the unincorporated portions of the township in 2010.

Geography
Located in the northeastern corner of the county along the Michigan border, it borders the following townships:
Ogden Township, Lenawee County, Michigan - north
Riga Township, Lenawee County, Michigan - northeast corner
Richfield Township, Lucas County - east
Spencer Township, Lucas County - southeast corner
Fulton Township - south
Pike Township - southwest corner
Royalton Township - west
Fairfield Township, Lenawee County, Michigan - northwest corner

The village of Metamora is located in northeastern Amboy Township, and the unincorporated communities of Ai and Assumption lie in the township's south.

Name and history
Amboy Township was organized in 1837. It is the only Amboy Township statewide.

Government
The township is governed by a three-member board of trustees, who are elected in November of odd-numbered years to a four-year term beginning on the following January 1. Two are elected in the year after the presidential election and one is elected in the year before it. There is also an elected township fiscal officer, who serves a four-year term beginning on April 1 of the year after the election, which is held in November of the year before the presidential election. Vacancies in the fiscal officership or on the board of trustees are filled by the remaining trustees.

References

External links
County website

Townships in Fulton County, Ohio
Townships in Ohio